The Church of the Blessed Virgin Mary is a historic Roman Catholic church in Újlak, in the Budapest II district of Hungary.

History 
Above its main entrance is a Latin inscription (CREATORI 1705 CREATURA) announcing the year the parish was founded. 

The main altar was designed by Kristóf Hickisch and inaugurated in 1799. The bell tower, designed in the middle of the main façade, had to be demolished in 1765 due to a static defect, and the tower to the south side was replaced. The top had to be renovated twice due to elemental disasters (a rainstorm in 1875). Its present form was given by Miklós Ybl in 1877. It was then that it gained the eclectic look it has today. It was renovated in 1957-1960 and again in 1997.

Church interior 

Underneath the triple arch line, which holds the organ gallery, is the one-nave interior covered with three vaults. In terms of proportions and layout, it seems larger than its actual extent; curved side lobes on both sides increase the spatial effect, with "retracted" wall sections for absorbing the horizontal forces of the arch straps.

The murals were painted in the 1920s.

Artwork 

The painting on the main altar is the Visitation of the Virgin Mary to Saint Elizabeth. During a visit by Falconer József Ferenc, there was a sculpture by Frigyes Held (1799). The rotating sanctuary is about the former 1761 altar. One pulpit (1747-48), gift of a Buda clarinet, 1774; the altar of St. Anna on the other side of a triumphal arch - from a church in Matthias - can be used here in 1779. 

A carved Pietà statue was supplied in 1818 by Lőrinc Dunaiszky. The side altars are made up of donations from new citizens and their dear saints (St. Sebastian's plays a multiplier role). It was claimed to be Saint Florian (1778). Another next step: St. Anthony of Padua (1777–78), followed by an altar of the Virgin Mary (1760). The closest to the main altar is the Altar of the Heart of Jesus, formerly the seat of St. John of Nepomuk, in 1782. It was likely a statue from 1902. The Rieger organ, as of 2022, is not working, and it needs repair.

In the 20th century, religious halls were added to the originally 18th-century parish building.

References 
 https://web.archive.org/web/20191213083135/https://www.esztergomi-ersekseg.hu/plebaniak/sarlos-boldogasszony-plebania-budapest-ujlak

Roman Catholic churches in Budapest